Bè is a canton and neighborhood of Lomé, Togo, located on the lagoon, east of the city. It contains a number of hotels and bars.

Notable people
Agbagli Kossi (1935-1991), sculptor

References
                    

Neighborhoods of Lomé
Cantons of Togo